Andalusian is a dialect of Spanish spoken in Andalusia, Spain. However, a recent fringe movement has aimed at the differentiation of Andalusian from Spanish and at its standardization. Several groups and organizations have emerged attempting to defend the notion of Andalusian as a separate language from Spanish, such as the Society for the Study of Andalusian (ZEA), Er Prinçipito Andalûh (EPA) and AndaluGeeks.

 ("Standard for Andalusian"; EPA), a standardized orthographic norm for Andalusian, is one of the most impactful initiatives coming from the movement. The EPA has seen use by various users on the Internet, and a dictionary, a keyboard for Android, a Spanish–Andalusian transcriber and Andalusian versions of Minecraft, Telegram and Wikipedia have been created using this writing system.

Background
Andalusian is considered by linguistic publications such as Ethnologue a dialect of the Spanish language. However, in recent times, there have been fringe efforts to promote the dialect of Andalusia as a language of its own, with its own orthographic norms. The newspaper Libertad Digital ("Digital Freedom") has accused the movement of only being promoted by the "Andalusian nationalist far-left" and its followers.

History

Despite having informally started its activities four years earlier, in 2006, the Society for the Study of Andalusian (or Zoziedá' pal Ehtudio' el Andalú; ZEA) was established and drafted its "legal constitution". In a 2008 interview by 20 minutos ("20 minutes"), Guadalupe Vázquez (Guadalupe Bahkeh), member of the ZEA, explained that the members of the organization had been striving for years for "conserving our cultural legacy, something which the statute of autonomy recognizes and which we have absolute certainty that exists with an identity of its own, the Andalusian language". She also explained that the ZEA was integrated by anthropologists, linguists and writers who were "people who are very Andalusist culturally" and who "believe that we are being Castilianized since many years and that if we do not avoid it, Andalusian will end up disappearing". Juan Porras (Huan Porrah), a writer member of the ZEA, was working at the time on a proposal of orthographic norms for Andalusian.

In 2017, Porras published his translation of The Little Prince in Andalusian, being titled Er Prinzipito. It was presented by the Andalusian Workers' Union (SAT) on 9 May of that year. Many users on Twitter mocked the book. As a result of the controversy this book provoked, a Facebook page named after it, Er Prinçipito Andalûh ("The Andalusian Prince"; EPA), was created, becoming an online gathering point for several linguists, translators and regular Andalusian speakers. Afterwards, this group worked on the creation of an orthographic system aimed at the standardization of Andalusian,  ("Standard for Andalusian"; also EPA). This later saw the development of a manual transcriber from Spanish to Andalusian, using the EPA system, in 2018. The EPA gained some traction on the Internet, being used by some users in their social media profiles.

In the summer of 2018, Ksar Feui, a physicist with interests in linguistics, started developing an automatic algorithm for transcribing Spanish to EPA Andalusian. He has praised the EPA as a "historic milestone", and has declared on a 2021 interview by La Voz del Sur that when he found out about the EPA, he transcribed all his earlier literary works to this writing system and then asked a friend to download all words of the dictionary of the Royal Spanish Academy (RAE) to transcribe them to the EPA for developing this algorithm. Feui was joined by several other friends and collaborators, together with whom he started the project AndaluGeeks in 2019, and in February 2019, their algorithm for transcribing Spanish text to EPA Andalusian was published. Afterwards, AndaluGeeks started online courses for learning Andalusian and involved itself in the creation of an Andalusian keyboard for Android with autocorrection and predictive text, an Andalusian dictionary and Andalusian versions of Minecraft, Telegram and Wikipedia, with the latter transcribing all Spanish Wikipedia articles into Andalusian; all of these following the EPA.

In 2021, senator and Adelante Andalucía ("Forward Andalusia") member  declared on the Senate of Spain that "Andalusian is our natural language. And it is not inferior to any other language of the State. We speak it without complexes." and that "we have, in addition, Andalusian linguists with proposals for an orthography". She later published the same statements on her Twitter account in EPA Andalusian.

See also
 Andalusian nationalism
 Language secessionism
 Languages of Spain
 Valencian language

References

External links
  of AndaluGeeks, in English
 , an Andalusian version of the Spanish Wikipedia by AndaluGeeks
  by AndaluGeeks
 
  of the Society for the Study of Andalusian (Zoziedá pal Ehtudio'el Andalú, ZEA)

Language movement
Language movement
Linguistic controversies
Left-wing politics in Spain